Stanwellia is a genus of South Pacific mygalomorph spiders in the family Pycnothelidae. It was first described by W. J. Rainbow & R. H. Pulleine in 1918. Originally placed with the curtain-web spiders, it was transferred to the funnel-web trapdoor spiders in 1985, then to the Pycnothelidae in 2020. It is a senior synonym of Aparua.

Species

 it contains eighteen species, found in New Zealand and Australia:
Stanwellia annulipes (C. L. Koch, 1841) – Australia (Tasmania)
Stanwellia bipectinata (Todd, 1945) – New Zealand
Stanwellia grisea (Hogg, 1901) – Australia (Victoria)
Stanwellia hapua (Forster, 1968) – New Zealand
Stanwellia hoggi (Rainbow, 1914) (type) – Australia (New South Wales)
Stanwellia hollowayi (Forster, 1968) – New Zealand
Stanwellia houhora (Forster, 1968) – New Zealand
Stanwellia inornata Main, 1972 – Australia (Victoria)
Stanwellia kaituna (Forster, 1968) – New Zealand
Stanwellia media (Forster, 1968) – New Zealand
Stanwellia minor (Kulczyński, 1908) – Australia (New South Wales)
Stanwellia nebulosa (Rainbow & Pulleine, 1918) – Australia (South Australia)
Stanwellia occidentalis Main, 1972 – Australia (South Australia)
Stanwellia pexa (Hickman, 1930) – Australia (Tasmania)
Stanwellia puna (Forster, 1968) – New Zealand
Stanwellia regia (Forster, 1968) – New Zealand
Stanwellia taranga (Forster, 1968) – New Zealand
Stanwellia tuna (Forster, 1968) – New Zealand

See also
 List of Pycnothelidae species

References

Further reading

External links
Melbourne Trapdoor spider
Melbourne Trap-door Spider Stanwellia grisea
Victorian Funnel web, Trap-door spiders and Mouse spiders. Which spiders do Victorians mistake for a Sydney Funnel-web?

Araneomorphae genera
Pycnothelidae
Spiders of Australia
Spiders of New Zealand
Taxa named by William Joseph Rainbow